= Josie Padluq =

Inuk artist

- Born: 1971 (age 53–54); Iqaluit, Qikiqtaaluk (Nunavut)

Josie Padluq (1971) is an Inuk artist.

His work is included in the collections of the Musée national des beaux-arts du Québec and the Penn Museum
